Recurrent toxin-mediated perineal erythema is an unusual condition that presents 2–3 days after a throat infection as a fine diffuse macular erythema of the perineal region.

See also 
 Brill–Zinsser disease
 List of cutaneous conditions

References 

Bacterium-related cutaneous conditions